Russell Simon (born 17 October 1949) is an Australian basketball player. He competed in the men's tournament at the 1976 Summer Olympics.

References

External links
 

1949 births
Living people
Australian men's basketball players
1970 FIBA World Championship players
Olympic basketball players of Australia
Basketball players at the 1976 Summer Olympics
Place of birth missing (living people)